Antler Dance is the fourth album by Minneapolis Celtic rock band Boiled in Lead. It was the band's first recording with vocalist/guitarist Adam Stemple, who replaced Todd Menton after his departure in 1992. Founding bassist Drew Miller has called this personnel change the most significant shift in the band's history. Fiddler Josef Kessler also replaced the departed David Stenshoel. Stemple's addition to the band led to a heavier, more heavy metal-influenced sound, as well as a strengthening of the band's ties to the science fiction and fantasy community. Two songs on Antler Dance were co-written by fantasy novelist and Stemple's Cats Laughing bandmate Steven Brust, and "Robin's Complaint" was written by Stemple's mother, novelist Jane Yolen. The album also includes covers of Boney M.'s "Rasputin" and Bruce Springsteen's "State Trooper", originally from his album Nebraska.

Track listing

References

1994 albums
Boiled in Lead albums